The 2014 SAFF Women's Championship was an association football tournament for women's national teams organised by the South Asian Football Federation (SAFF). It was the third edition of the tournament since the first one in 2010. The competition was contested by the eight SAFF members. India were the reigning champions.

The tournament was hosted in Islamabad, Pakistan from 11 to 21 November 2014.

In the final, India beat Nepal for the third time and to remain the only nation to lift the title. Indian player Ngangom Bala Devi won the top-scorer award, scoring 16 goals in five matches.

Host selection 
On 10 September 2013, SAFF executive committee decided that 3rd SAFF Women's Championship will be held in Pakistan.

Venue

Jinnah Sports Stadium in Islamabad hosted all the matches. Although entry to all games was free, there were very few local spectators. After a suicide attack one week before start, there were some security concerns but the tournament was considered safe by the Pakistan Football Federation. Some matches were televised.

Teams 
 
 
   
 
 
 
 (host)

Fixtures and results
Draw was done on 10 November 2014 at Manager's meeting.

Group A

Group B

Knockout stage

Semi-finals

Final

Goalscorers
16 goals 
  Ngangom Bala Devi

 6 goals 
  Indumathi Kathiresan

 5 goals 
  Anu Lama
  Irom Prameshwori Devi

 4 goals
  Sabina Khatun
  Yumnam Kamala Devi
  Sajana Rana

3 goals 
  Krishna Rani Sarkar

2 goals

  Suinu Pru Marma
  Dipa Adhikari
  Erandi Kumudumala

1 goals

  Marjan Haydaree
  Musammat Mummun Ather
  Jyoti Ann Burrett
  Moirangthem Mandakini Devi
  Oinam Bembem Devi
  Thokchom Umapati Devi
  Mariyam Rifa
  Sabitra Bhandari
  Menuka Giri
  Niru Thapa
  Sehar Zaman
  Shahlyla Baloch
  Shenaz Roshan
  Malika Noor
  Hajra Khan
  Achala Chitrani
  Ishara Madushani
  Praveena Perea

References

External links
Tournament at goalnepal.com
Results at futbol24.com
Results at kolkatafootball.com

2014 in Asian football
2014 in women's association football
2014
2014
2014 in Bangladeshi football
2014–15 in Indian football
2014–15 in Pakistani football
2014 in Maldivian football
2014 in Bhutanese football
2014–15 in Sri Lankan football
2014–15 in Nepalese football
2014 in Afghan football
November 2014 sports events in Asia 
Women's football competitions in Pakistan